Maurice Lefebvre can refer to:

 Maurice Lefebvre (footballer)
 Maurice Lefèbvre (water polo)